Enteroplax yaeyamensis is a species of air-breathing land snail, terrestrial pulmonate gastropod mollusks in the family Strobilopsidae.

Distribution 
This species occurs in:
 Yaeyama Islands, Japan

The type locality is Sonai, Irimote Island, Yaeyama Islands.

This is a vulnerable species.

Description 
The width of the shell is 2.2 mm; the height of the shell is 1.7 mm.

References

External links 

Strobilopsidae
Molluscs of Japan
Endemic fauna of the Ryukyu Islands
Gastropods described in 1974